Koreoleptoxis amurensis is a species of freshwater snail with an operculum, an aquatic gastropod mollusk in the family Semisulcospiridae.

Taxonomy
Strong et al. (2009) and Kantor et al. (2010) classified this species in the genus "Parajuga" Prozorova et Starobogatov, 2003; however Parajuga is not available name.

Distribution 
This species occurs in rivers of the Amur River basin.

The type locality is "im Amur, im mittleren Laufe und einem Theile des unteren dieses Stromes".

Ecology
Koreoleptoxis amurensis serves as the first intermediate host for Clonorchis sinensis in China and as the first intermediate host of Paragonimus westermani.

References

External links
 

Semisulcospiridae